Štefan Maixner (born 14 April 1968) is a former Slovak football striker. He played in the Gambrinus liga for Drnovice in 1993.

External links

References

1968 births
Living people
Slovak footballers
Slovakia international footballers
Association football forwards
FC DAC 1904 Dunajská Streda players
ŠK Slovan Bratislava players
FC Petržalka players
FC ViOn Zlaté Moravce players
Czech First League players
FK Drnovice players
Slovak Super Liga players
Footballers from Bratislava